Metanarsia mongola is a moth of the family Gelechiidae. It is found in Mongolia.

The wingspan is 21–23 mm. The forewings are light brown. The hindwings are light grey. Adults are on wing from July to early August.

References

Moths described in 2008
Metanarsia